In mathematics, a random minimum spanning tree may be formed by assigning random weights from some distribution to the edges of an undirected graph, and then constructing the minimum spanning tree of the graph.

In contrast to uniformly random spanning trees of complete graphs, for which the typical diameter is proportional to the square root of the number of vertices, random minimum spanning trees of complete graphs have typical diameter proportional to the cube root.

Random minimum spanning trees of grid graphs may be used for invasion percolation models of liquid flow through a porous medium, and for maze generation.

References

Spanning tree